Universal Gemological Laboratories (GCI) is a gemological laboratory and a college for educational services founded in 1998. The laboratory's main headquarters is in the Israel Diamond Exchange in Ramat Gan. The GCI has regional labs and educational centers equipped with local and Israeli staff in Russia and, since June 2006, in India—a disposition of four branches in Mumbai, Delhi, Hyderabad and Kolkata. GCI is the only western laboratory that is officially permitted by the Russian government to operate in Russia.

As a licensed member of the Association of Gemological Laboratories of Japan (AGL), the gemological laboratory TGL Israel is officially registered and recognized by JJA /AGL Master Stones (color) administrative committee. The AGL was established in 1981 for the purpose of standardization of diamond grading based on the method used at the Gemological Institute of America (GIA) and on the nomenclature of color in diamonds as used by the association of Gemological Laboratories in Japan (AGL). This assures that each certificate issued conforms to the highest Japanese standards. GCI is working under the strict standard institution of ISO – International Organization for Standardization.

Research
GCI contributes to the knowledge base of the gemological world by publishing and conducting research and experiments on an array of gemstones:  from simple crystals to synthetic diamonds. All publications are free to access via the GCI website (English/Hebrew). GCI research laboratory is a pioneer in research of new gemstone cutting shapes and supplying the scientific aspect of patent applications.

Education
Various courses are offered by the college, and the curriculum for each course is designed to train the student in each technical aspect of diamond grading, gem identification and practical work. The educational level is of GIA standards and the classes are fitted with gemological testing equipment.

Services
GCI offers the following services according to GIA and AGL standards.

•	Gem identification 
•	Guiding, sorting and consultation for manufacturers throughout the entire manufacturing process. 
•	Guiding and consulting regarding repairs. 
•	Sorting for color, clarity, polish and symmetry. 
•	Certificate for mounted jewelry. 
•	Laser inscription services. 
•	Fancy color identification, authenticity check of color and certification. 
•	Identification of HPHT treatments and bombardments with FTIR and SPECTROPHOTOMETER.  
•	Identification of clarity enhancements, laser drillings and internal drillings (KM). 
•	Identification of man-made diamond (CVD-HPHT) and imitations.
•	GCI is qualified for Insurance companies and in the court of law as an expert opinion.

References

Further reading
Rapaport's global guide to gemological laboratories vol.28 no.41  November 2005
IGC changes name and strengthens status as education provider IDEX MAGAZINE NO 226: POLISHED - February 9 Page 76
Making the diamond education grade  IDEX MAGAZINE NO 228: POLISHED - April 9 pages 94–97
Organization profile gci gemological centers inc IDEX MAGAZINE NO 228: POLISHED - April 9 page 113 
Yakar, Ben-Zion (August 2010) The impact of HPHT on a diamond's colour Solitaire Magazine pages 95–98
Pelerinaj stralucitor The One Magazine: pages 84–85

External links
GCI - Official site 
  SSEF FACETTE, International Issue No. 12, January 2005
Israelidiamond.co.il

Gemological laboratories
Diamond cutting
Synthetic diamond